Evelyn Ning-Yi Wang is a mechanical engineer at the Massachusetts Institute of Technology (MIT), where she is the Ford Professor of Mechanical Engineering, director of the Device Research Laboratory, and chair of the Department of Mechanical Engineering. Topics in her research include heat transfer, ultrahydrophobicity, solar energy and nanostructures.

Biography
Wang is the daughter of Kang L. Wang, an electrical engineer who emigrated from Taiwan to the US to become a graduate student at MIT; her mother Edith Wang was also a Taiwanese graduate student at MIT, where both parents met one another. Her father became a professor at the University of California, Los Angeles, and Wang grew up in Santa Monica, California, attending public school there and traveling internationally as part of a youth orchestra.

Like her parents and her two older brothers, Wang attended MIT herself, earning a bachelor's degree there in 2000. Her doctorate is from Stanford University in 2006. Her dissertation, Characterization of Microfabricated Two-Phase Heat Sinks for IC Cooling Applications, was jointly supervised by Thomas W. Kenny and Kenneth E. Goodson.

Wang did postdoctoral research at Bell Labs before returning to MIT as a faculty member in 2007.

Career and research
Wang is particularly known for her research on solar-powered devices to extract drinkable water from the atmosphere. Scientific American and the World Economic Forum named her technology that produces water from air in an arid climate as one of the "Top 10 Emerging Technologies of 2017". Her water extraction device, which she designed in collaboration with Omar M. Yaghi, has been compared to the moisture  on the desert planet Tatooine in Star Wars. However, rather than using refrigeration to condense water vapor, it uses a metal–organic framework to trap water vapor in the night and then uses the heat from solar energy to release the water from the framework during the day. Her research group has also developed a solar powered desalination system in producing clean water.

Biden administration
Wang was nominated by President Joe Biden in March 2022 as director of the Advanced Research Projects Agency-Energy of the U.S. Department of Energy. She was confirmed by the United States Senate on December 22, 2022.

Awards and honors
Wang was awarded the Young Faculty Award by the U.S. Defense Advanced Research Projects Agency in 2008 for the project Tunable Nanostructured Arrays for Stable High-Flux Microchannel Heat Sinks. She was awarded the Air Force Office of Scientific Research Young Investigator Award in 2011, the U.S. Office of Naval Research Young Investigator Award in 2012,  and the American Society of Mechanical Engineers (ASME) Bergles-Rohsenow Young Investigator Award in 2012. The ASME gave Wang their Gustus L. Larson Memorial Award in 2017; she is also a Fellow of the ASME. In 2018 she and co-author Omar M. Yaghi won the 8th Prince Sultan bin Abdulaziz International Prize for Water. She was named to the 2021 class of Fellows of the American Association for the Advancement of Science.

References

External links

Living people
American people of Taiwanese descent
American mechanical engineers
American women engineers
MIT School of Engineering alumni
Stanford University alumni
MIT School of Engineering faculty
Fellows of the American Society of Mechanical Engineers
Fellows of the American Association for the Advancement of Science
21st-century American engineers
21st-century women engineers
1978 births
American women academics
21st-century American women
Biden administration personnel